The Popigai impact structure is the eroded remnant of an impact crater in northern Siberia, Russia. It is tied with the Manicouagan structure as the fourth largest verified impact structure on Earth. A large bolide impact created the  diameter crater approximately 35 million years ago during the late Eocene epoch (Priabonian stage). It might be linked to the Eocene–Oligocene extinction event.

It is designated by UNESCO as a Geopark, a site of special geological heritage. There is a small possibility that the Popigai impact crater may have formed simultaneously with the approximately 35-million-year-old Chesapeake Bay and Toms Canyon impact craters.
 
For decades, the Popigai impact structure has fascinated paleontologists and geologists, but the entire area was completely off limits because of the diamonds found there. However, a major investigatory expedition was undertaken in 1997, which greatly advanced understanding of the structure. The impactor in this event has been identified as either an  diameter chondrite asteroid, or a  diameter stony asteroid.

The shock pressures from the impact instantaneously transformed graphite in the ground into diamonds within a  radius of the impact point. The diamonds inherited the tabular shape of the original graphite grains and also the original crystals' delicate striations.

Diamond deposits 

Most modern industrial diamonds are produced synthetically. The diamond deposits at Popigai have not been mined because of the remote location and lack of infrastructure, and are unlikely to be competitive with synthetic diamonds.  Many of the diamonds at Popigai contain crystalline lonsdaleite, an allotrope of carbon that has a hexagonal lattice. Pure, laboratory-created lonsdaleite is up to 58% harder than ordinary diamonds. These types of diamonds are known as "impact diamonds" because they are thought to be produced when a meteorite strikes a graphite deposit at high velocity.  They may have industrial uses but are unsuitable as gems.

Additionally, carbon polymorphs, a combination of diamond and lonsdaleite even harder than pure lonsdaleite, have been discovered in the crater.

See also 
 List of impact craters on Earth
 List of possible impact structures on Earth

References

External links 
 Earth Impact Database
 About the Popigai impact structure
 UNESCO Global Geopark Network
 Google Maps

Impact craters of Russia
Impact craters of the Arctic
Eocene impact craters
Priabonian Stage
Landforms of Krasnoyarsk Krai
Diamond mines in Russia
Diamond mines in the Soviet Union